William Howard Arnold is an American nuclear physicist, with primary areas of expertise in nuclear power, nuclear fuel, and nuclear waste disposal. He was president and manager of the first privately owned uranium-enrichment facility in the United States, Louisiana Energy Services.  He was responsible for reactor physics design of the first series of Westinghouse Corporation commercial nuclear reactors, and served as president of the Nuclear International Division of Westinghouse Corporation. He designed nuclear reactor cores for civilian power reactors, for space power and propulsion, and for production of nuclear materials. He managed multidisciplinary groups of engineers and scientists working in reactor core design, and led work that promoted the use of centrifuge technology in uranium enrichment.

He was general manager of the Advanced Energy Systems Division of Westinghouse Electric Company. From 1986 to 1989, he was vice president of Westinghouse Hanford Company, responsible for engineering, development and project management at the Hanford Site. Later in his career he became involved in an advisory capacity in the cleanup of Department of Energy (DOE) nuclear weapons material production sites, such as in the vitrification plant at the Savannah River Site.

In 1974, he was elected to the National Academy of Engineering for his contributions to the systems engineering of light-water nuclear power plants and to the design of commercial pressurized water reactors for nuclear systems. He is a Fellow of and served on the board of directors of the American Nuclear Society. He is an expert on nuclear waste disposal, participating in several National Academy of Sciences studies, including chairing the 2003 study, titled "Improving the Scientific Basis for Managing DOE's Excess Nuclear Materials and Spent Nuclear Fuel".

In 2004, United States President George W. Bush appointed Dr. Arnold to the U.S. Nuclear Waste Technical Review Board.

Education
William Howard Arnold received his bachelor's degree in chemistry and physics from Cornell University in 1951, his Masters in physics from Princeton University in 1953, and his Ph.D. in experimental physics from Princeton 1955.

Family
Howard was the son of Elizabeth Welsh (Mullen) and Lieutenant General William Howard Arnold. With his wife, Josephine (Routheau), his daughter is Chemical Engineering Professor and 2018 Nobel Prize winner Frances Arnold.

References

Living people
Cornell University alumni
Princeton University alumni
American nuclear physicists
Members of the United States National Academy of Engineering
Year of birth missing (living people)